The men's 3000 metres event at the 2013 European Athletics Indoor Championships was held on March 1, 2013 at 12:35 (round 1), and March 2, 18:20 (final) local time.

Records

Results

Round 1
Qualification: First 4 (Q) or and the 4 fastest athletes (q) advanced to the final.

Final 
The final was held at 18:20.

References

3000 metres at the European Athletics Indoor Championships
2013 European Athletics Indoor Championships